Princess Ghaliya or Ghaliyya Al-Badry Al_Bogami (died 1818) was a Saudi woman who led military resistance to prevent the Ottoman recapture of Mecca during the Ottoman–Muslim War. She was given the title Amira, which is the female version of the title Emir which means princess, in recognition of her acts.

Biography
Ghaliyya bint Abdelrahman Al-Bogammy was a Hanbali Bedouin from Tarba near Ta'if southeast of Mecca. She was the daughter of Sheikh Abd al-Rahman bin Sultan al-Badri from the Kalash family. Ghaliyya was the wife of prince Hamad Ben Abduallah ben-Umhay, the governor of Tarba for the Emirate of Diriyah.  She was described as intelligent, and used the fortune she inherited from her father to support her husband and their home and religion. When her husband was injured during the Hijaz wars and his injuries made him an invalid for years before he died, he made his wife the guardian of their minor son and heir, and thus in effect his regent. 

During the Wahhabi War (1811-1818), Mecca was under attack from the Ottoman Empire, and she formed a military resistance movement to defend Mecca against the Ottoman forces.  She allied with Al-Baqum, and provided Al-Baqum with money and provisions to fight the Ottoman. Because of her active participation the Ottomans assumed that she was the ruling princess of the area, though she acted as the guardian of her son. 

She was credited with boldness and strategic ability, and chronicles describe her participation: "Never had the resistance of the Arab tribes from the vicinity of Mecca been so strong as was that of the Arabs of Tarba ... . They had at their head a woman who bore the name of Ghaliyya." Ghaliya's tactics enabled her forces to repel Ottoman incursions successfully during the beginning of the war. Incapable of admitting that they could be defeated by a woman, the opponents spread rumours accusing her of being a sorceress who cast the Wahhabi forces invisible.

Specifically, this was to have taken place at the Battle of Turaba in 1814: "A number of incidents ensued (including a Saudi victory under the command of a woman, Ghaliya, at the Battle of Turaba in 1814)...", and: "Initially, Muhammad Ali suffered a series of military failures. In late 1813 and early 1814, his troops were defeated near Turaba and Qunfudha. In the Turaba battle, the Wahhabis were commanded by a woman, named Ghaliya, to whom the Egyptians immediately ascribed the power of casting the evil eye".

Notes

References

External links
 Guida Myrl Jackson-Laufer: Women Rulers Throughout the Ages: An Illustrated Guide

Women in 19th-century warfare
Women in war in the Middle East
19th-century women rulers
Saudi Arabian women
Year of birth unknown
1818 deaths
Arab women in war